Tomorrow's World Today is an innovation-based television series about companies from around the world on the cutting edge of tomorrow's technology. It is hosted by George Davison and features field reporters Tamara Krinsky, Darieth Chisolm, Greg Constantino, David Carmine, and Jackie Long. The show premiered on the Science Channel on Saturday, May 5, 2018 and airs on the Science Channel and Discovery. Tomorrow's World Today explores concepts in science and technology and is a combination of content shot in a studio and in the field. The series introduces innovative pioneers from around the world who are forming new ways to utilize natural and technological resources to create a more sustainable society. The Tomorrow's World Today® field reporters travel around the globe to learn more about technologies and innovations. The show was inspired by the long-running BBC program Tomorrow's World.

Awards 
While the show has not won any awards, Tomorrow's World Today was nominated for a Daytime Emmy for Outstanding Art Direction/Set Decoration/Scenic Design in 2019.

Airings 
After an episode premieres on Science Channel and Discovery, it can be accessed and streamed on TomorrowsWorldToday.com.

Show Synopsis 

Tomorrow's World Today's focuses on the latest innovations and news (in the worlds of creation, production, innovation, inspiration) in technology, science, and sustainability taking place around the world.

1. The World of Inspiration: This is the first world. In the World of Inspiration, Tomorrow's World Today explores the mysteries of nature. Nature inspires us and without people who are inspired, the other three worlds cannot exist. When we are inspired, we create.

2. The World of Creation: This world does all sorts of traditional artistic work: glass blowing, blacksmithing, gardening, painting and much more. If you think about it, the traditional arts of the past - which are the hobbies and crafts of today - were at one time innovations (like inventing blue glass to create drinking glasses or white porcelain to create plates). These traditional crafts not only make us feel good because we are creating, but they also teach the basics of how to make things. 

3. The World of Innovation: In this world, we draw upon knowledge from the World of Creation in raw material science, manufacturing know-how, and more to inspire us to push into the next frontier of innovation, so we can attempt to discover and make new things for the benefit of humankind. 

4. The World of Production: Once we innovate new things, we need to learn how to scale it up so it can become more available to more people at a more affordable price! In order to scale up, we need to create methodologies and equipment which creates the World of Production (think car factory, candy factory and more).

It is in these 4 worlds that the stories of Tomorrow's World Today are told.

The first season of the TV series focused on George Davison's creative vision of building a sustainable "Park of the Future".

References

External links 
 Tomorrow's World Today Latest News and Innovations
 
 Tomorrow's World Today on the Science Channel
 Tomorrow's World Today on Discovery
 Tomorrow's World Today on TV Regular
 Tomorrow's World Today on Rotten Tomatoes

American non-fiction television series
Science Channel original programming
2018 American television series debuts